Dawa Hotessa is an Ethiopian professional footballer who plays as a forward for Ethiopian Premier League club Adama City and the Ethiopia national team.

International career
In August 2014, coach Mariano Barreto invited Hotessa to be a part of the Ethiopia squad for the 2015 Africa Cup of Nations qualification.

In August 2018, Hotessa was included in the provisional Ethiopian National team invited by coach Abraham Mebratu for the 2019 African Cup of Nations qualification.

International goals
Scores and results list Ethiopia's goal tally first.

References

Living people
Ethiopian footballers
Hadiya Hossana F.C. players
2014 African Nations Championship players
1986 births
Association football forwards
Adama City F.C. players
Ethiopia international footballers
2021 Africa Cup of Nations players
Ethiopia A' international footballers
Saint George S.C. players